Nicolas Damont, known as Werewolf of Châlons, Tailor of Châlons or Demon Tailor of Châlons (died 1598), was a French man executed for murder, cannibalism and for being a werewolf.

The case
Nicolas Damont was active as a tailor with his own workshop in the city of Châlons.

He was put on trial accused of having murdered a number of children. He was accused of having lured children into his tailor shop, subjected them to sexual abuse, murdered them by cutting their throats, and of eating them. He was also accused of having hunted for his child victims in the forests in the shape of a wolf, and thereby of being a werewolf. 

When his tailor shop was searched by the authorities, they reportedly found human bones in the basement. Nicolas Damont reportedly confessed to his crimes before the court. His confessions were reportedly so horrible that the court ordered that the court documents of his confessions be destroyed. 

Nicolas Damont was sentenced to death for murder, cannibalism and for being a werewolf. He was executed by burning alive at the stake. According to tradition, he was said to have uttered curses and called for the Devil when he was burned.

Legacy
The case became a well known subject of folklore and myth. It has also been suspected of having been a legend, though it has proven to be an actual case.

See also 
 Hans the Werewolf
 Gilles Garnier
 Peter Stubbe
 Henry Gardinn

References

 A. Rowlands Witchcraft and Masculinities in Early Modern Europe
 S. Baring-Gould The Book of Were-Wolves
 Nigel Cawthorne Witch Hunt: History of Persecution

1598 deaths
16th-century executions by France
Executed French serial killers
French cannibals
French murderers of children
Male serial killers
People executed by France by burning
French people executed for witchcraft
Werewolves
Witch trials in France
Year of birth unknown